Maxwell MacLagan Wedderburn (25 March 1883 – 30 June 1953) was an acting Governor of British Ceylon. He was appointed on 30 June 1937 and was acting Governor until 16 October 1937. He was succeeded by Andrew Caldecott.

References

Governors of British Ceylon
British expatriates in Sri Lanka
19th-century British people
1883 births
1953 deaths
Chief Secretaries of Ceylon